Armenia participated in the Eurovision Song Contest 2017 with the song "Fly with Me" written by Lilith Navasardyan, Levon Navasardyan, Avet Barseghyan and David Tserunyan. The song was performed by Artsvik, who was selected through the national final Depi Evratesil organised by the Armenian broadcaster Public Television of Armenia (AMPTV) to represent Armenia in the 2017 contest in Kyiv, Ukraine. The national final involved 75 contestants and took place over three months. Two contestants ultimately qualified to compete in the final on 24 December 2016 where a jury panel and a public televote selected Artsvik as the winner. The song "Fly with Me" was selected internally and later presented to the public on 18 March 2017.

Armenia was drawn to compete in the first semi-final of the Eurovision Song Contest which took place on 9 May 2017. Performing during the show in position 16, "Fly with Me" was announced among the top 10 entries of the first semi-final and therefore qualified to compete in the final on 13 May. It was later revealed that Armenia placed seventh out of the 18 participating countries in the semi-final with 152 points. In the final, Armenia performed in position 5 and placed eighteenth out of the 26 participating countries with 79 points.

Background 

Prior to the 2017 contest, Armenia had participated in the Eurovision Song Contest ten times since its first entry in 2006. Its highest placing in the contest, to this point, has been fourth place, which the nation achieved on two occasions: in 2008 with the song "Qélé, Qélé" performed by Sirusho and in 2014 with the song "Not Alone" performed by Aram Mp3. Armenia had, to this point, failed to qualify to the final on only one occasion in 2011. The nation briefly withdrew from the contest in 2012 due to long-standing tensions with then host country Azerbaijan. In 2016, "LoveWave" performed by Iveta Mukuchyan placed seventh in the final.

The Armenian national broadcaster, Public Television of Armenia (AMPTV), broadcasts the event within Armenia and organises the selection process for the nation's entry. AMPTV confirmed their intentions to participate at the 2017 Eurovision Song Contest on 30 June 2016. Armenia has used various methods to select the Armenian entry in the past, such as a live televised national final to choose the performer, song or both to compete at Eurovision. However internal selections have also been held on occasion. Since 2014, the broadcaster internally selected both the artist and the song. However, AMPTV announced along with their participation confirmation that a national final would be organized to select the Armenian performer for the 2017 contest, with the song being internally selected.

Before Eurovision

Depi Evratesil
Depi Evratesil (Towards Eurovision) was the first edition of the national final Depi Evratesil and selected the Armenian representative for the Eurovision Song Contest 2017. The competition involved a three-month-long process that commenced on 1 October 2016 and concluded with a winning artist on 24 December 2016. All shows in the competition took place at the AMPTV studios in Yerevan, hosted by Gohar Gasparyan and broadcast on Armenia 1 as well as online via the broadcaster's website 1tv.am.

Format
The national final took place over four stages and consisted of ten episodes. The first stage was the auditions, aired between 1 and 15 October 2016. Following the auditions, 37 contestants were selected by a six-member judging panel to proceed to the second stage of the competition. The second stage was the Judges Selection, aired between 22 October and 12 November 2016 where each member of the judging panel selected four contestants for their teams. If the judges liked the performance, they had the option of pressing a button in front of them during the last ten seconds of each performance, with the first judge that pressed the button getting the contestant who would proceed to the third stage of the competition. The third stage was titled One of Two stage and aired between 19 November and 3 December 2016 where the judges selected two of their team members to battle against each other. The team's judge awarded three points to his/her favourite contestant and the other five judges awarded one point to their favourite contestant. The contestant that received the least points was eliminated. The two remaining contestants in each team battled against each other during the final round and the team's judge selected one contestant to proceed to the fourth stage, the Live Shows. Two semi-finals took place on 10 and 17 December 2016 where two contestants were eliminated per show. The two remaining contestants proceeded to the live final on 24 December 2016 where the winner was selected from the two finalists.

The results of the first three stages of the national final were determined exclusively by the six-member judging panel, while results of the live shows were determined by the 50/50 combination of votes from a jury panel and a public vote. The public were able to cast their votes via SMS, while the members of the jury panel varied in composition from show to show. The judging panel was made up of six previous Armenian Eurovision entrants and consisted of:

Iveta Mukuchyan (2016)
Essaï Altounian (2015)
Aram Mp3 (2014)
Inga Arshakyan (2009 and 2015)
Anush Arshakyan (2009)
Hayko (2007)

Contestants
On 6 July 2016, AMPTV announced an online application period with a deadline of 13 November 2015. Eligible applicants were those aged at least 16 and are of Armenian citizenship or heritage. The broadcaster received more than 120 applications at the closing of the deadline, among them being artists from the worldwide Armenian diaspora in the United States, France, Spain, Russia, Ukraine, Georgia, Uzbekistan and Lebanon. 75 of the applicants performed in front of the six-member judging panel during the auditions held in September 2016 and had two minutes to convince the judges, which focused on the artists vocal capacity, the performance on stage, and the overall impression by the act. 37 contestants were selected to proceed to the Judges Selection as more than three judges pressed their buttons for their performances.

Teams
  Winner
  Runner-up
  Third place
  Fourth place
  Eliminated in Semi-Final 1
  Eliminated in One of Two

Shows

Judges Selection

One of Two 
During the fifth and sixth episodes, twelve of the remaining contestants, two from each team, competed and one contestant per team advanced. During the seventh episode, the remaining two contestants from each team competed and one contestant per team qualified to the Live Shows.

Semi-final 1
The first semi-final took place on 10 December 2016. The remaining six contestants that qualified from the seventh episode competed and two were eliminated based on the 50/50 combination of votes from a nine-member professional jury panel and a public vote. The viewers and the juries each had a total of 189 points to award. Each jury member distributed their points from 1 to 6, while the viewer vote was based on the percentage of votes each song achieved. For example, if a song gained 10% of the viewer vote, then that entry would be awarded 10% of 189 points rounded to the nearest integer: 19 points. In addition to the performances of the contestants, the interval acts featured Armenian 2016 Junior Eurovision entrants Anahit & Mary with their song "Tarber".

Professional Jury Members

  (Conductor)
 Lira Kocharyan (Music producer)
 Lilit Navasardyan (Composer)
 Artur Asatryan (Music producer)
 Avet Barseghyan (TV presenter, songwriter)
  (TV producer)
 Kristina Avagimyan (Choreographer)
 Arthur Ghukasyan (TV producer)
 Nur (Designer, sculpture)

Semi-final 2
The second semi-final took place on 17 December 2016. The remaining four contestants that qualified from the first semi-final competed and two were eliminated based on the 50/50 combination of votes from an eleven-member international jury panel and a public vote. The viewers and the juries each had a total of 110 points to award. Each jury member distributed their points from 1 to 4, while the viewer vote was based on the percentage of votes each song achieved. For example, if a song gained 10% of the viewer vote, then that entry would be awarded 10% of 11 points rounded to the nearest integer: 11 points. In addition to the performances of the contestants, the interval acts featured Sos and Victoria Petrosyan with their quick-change acts.

International Jury Members

  – Olga Salamakha (TV presenter)
  – Joana Levieva-Sawyer (TV producer)
  – Klitos Klitou (TV producer)
  – Mart Normet (TV producer)
  – Nodiko Tatishvili (Singer)
  – Sopho Gelovani (Singer)
  –  (TV and radio journalist)
  – Gordon Bonello (TV producer)
  – Christer Björkman (Producer, singer)
  –   (Artistic director)
  – William Lee Adams (Editor)

Final 
The final took place on 24 December 2016. The two finalists that qualified from the second semi-final competed and the winner, Artsvik, was selected by the 50/50 combination of votes from a seven-member Panarmenian jury panel with members from the worldwide Armenian diaspora and a public vote. Both the jury and viewer vote were awarded based on the percentage of votes each song achieved. In addition to the performances of the contestants, the interval acts featured Cypriot 2017 Eurovision entrant Hovig with a mashup of his songs and "Hayi acher", and Armenia 2016 Eurovision entrant Iveta Mukuchyan with "LoveWave" and "Amenic amena".

Pan-Armenian Jury Members

  – Karen Asatryan (Musician, composer)
  – Rita Movsesian (Singer)
  –  (Singer)
  – Arthur Aharonyan (Violinist)
  –  (Music producer, composer)
  – Anais Heghoyan (Opera singer)
  – Arthur Gourounlian (Dancer, choreographer)

Song selection 
Following Artsvik's win at Depi Evratesil 2017 on 24 December 2016, AMPTV announced a public call for song submissions with a deadline of 30 January 2017. More than 300 songs were submitted by songwriters worldwide and ten songs were under consideration. The song "Fly with Me", composed by Lilith Navasardyan and Levon Navasardyan with lyrics by Avet Barseghyan and David Tserunyan, was announced as the Armenian entry on 9 March 2017. Artsvik filmed the official video for the song prior to the presentation, which was directed by Arthur Manukyan. The song and video were presented to the public on 18 March 2017.

Promotion 
Artsvik made several appearances across Europe to specifically promote "Fly with Me" as the Armenian Eurovision entry. Between 3 and 6 April, Artsvik took part in promotional activities in Tel Aviv, Israel and performed during the Israel Calling event held at the Ha'teatron venue. On 14 April, Artsvik performed during the Eurovision in Concert event which was held at the Melkweg venue in Amsterdam, Netherlands and hosted by Cornald Maas and Selma Björnsdóttir. Artsvik had also planned to take part in the Eurovision Pre-Party event on 4 April which would be held in Moscow, Russia, however, her participation was cancelled following the event's suspension.

At Eurovision 

All countries except the "Big Five" (France, Germany, Italy, Spain and the United Kingdom), and the host country, are required to qualify from one of two semi-finals in order to compete for the final; the top ten countries from each semi-final progress to the final. The European Broadcasting Union (EBU) split up the competing countries into six different pots based on voting patterns from previous contests, with countries with favourable voting histories put into the same pot. On 31 January 2017, a special allocation draw was held which placed each country into one of the two semi-finals, as well as which half of the show they would perform in. Armenia was placed into the first semi-final, to be held on 9 May 2017, and was scheduled to perform in the second half of the show.

Once all the competing songs for the 2017 contest had been released, the running order for the semi-finals was decided by the shows' producers rather than through another draw, so that similar songs were not placed next to each other. Armenia was set to perform in position 16, following the entry from the Cyprus and before the entry from Slovenia.

In Armenia, the two semi-finals and the final were broadcast on Armenia 1 and Public Radio of Armenia with commentary by Avet Barseghyan and Gohar Gasparyan (first semi-final and final). The Armenian spokesperson, who announced the top 12-point score awarded by the Armenian jury during the final, was Iveta Mukuchyan who had previously represented Armenia in the Eurovision Song Contest in 2016.

Semi-final

Artsvik took part in technical rehearsals on 1 and 5 May, followed by dress rehearsals on 8 and 9 May. This included the jury show on 9 May where the professional juries of each country watched and voted on the competing entries.

The Armenian performance featured Artsvik dressed in a black pant-suit and joined by two dancers on stage performing a routine which mainly involved hand movements. The stage presentation included smoke and pyrotechnic effects throughout the performance. The LED screens projected old traditional images in pink and purple colours with a hologram of a bird appearing and flying away at the end of the performance. The stage director and choreographer for the Armenian performance was Sacha Jean-Baptiste. The two dancers that joined Artsvik on stage were Fanny Svensson and Marlene Lindahl, while the singer was also joined by three off-stage backing vocalists: Anushik Ter-Ghukasyan, Amaliya Margaryan and Viktoria Pogosyan.

At the end of the show, Armenia was announced as having finished in the top 10 and subsequently qualifying for the grand final. It was later revealed that Armenia placed second in the semi-final, receiving a total of 152 points: 65 points from the televoting and 87 points from the juries.

Final
Shortly after the first semi-final, a winners' press conference was held for the ten qualifying countries. As part of this press conference, the qualifying artists took part in a draw to determine which half of the grand final they would subsequently participate in. This draw was done in the order the countries appeared in the semi-final running order. Armenia was drawn to compete in the first half. Following this draw, the shows' producers decided upon the running order of the final, as they had done for the semi-finals. Armenia was subsequently placed to perform in position 5, following the entry from Austria and before the entry from the Netherlands.

Artsvik once again took part in dress rehearsals on 12 and 13 May before the final, including the jury final where the professional juries cast their final votes before the live show. Artsvik performed a repeat of her semi-final performance during the final on 13 May. Armenia placed eighteenth in the final, scoring 79 points: 21 points from the televoting and 58 points from the juries.

Voting
Voting during the three shows involved each country awarding two sets of points from 1-8, 10 and 12: one from their professional jury and the other from televoting. Each nation's jury consisted of five music industry professionals who are citizens of the country they represent, with their names published before the contest to ensure transparency. This jury judged each entry based on: vocal capacity; the stage performance; the song's composition and originality; and the overall impression by the act. In addition, no member of a national jury was permitted to be related in any way to any of the competing acts in such a way that they cannot vote impartially and independently. The individual rankings of each jury member as well as the nation's televoting results were released shortly after the grand final.

Below is a breakdown of points awarded to Armenia and awarded by Armenia in the first semi-final and grand final of the contest, and the breakdown of the jury voting and televoting conducted during the two shows:

Points awarded to Armenia

Points awarded by Armenia

Detailed voting results
The following members comprised the Armenian jury:
 Ara Gevorgyan (jury chairperson)musician, composer
 Emma Asatryanvocal teacher, singer, songwriter
 Eduard Topchjanconductor (jury member in semi-final 1)
 Aramayis Hayrapetyandirector
 Zaruhi Babayansinger, vocal teacher
 Tigran Sanoyanmusician (jury member in the final)

References

External links 
 Official AMPTV Eurovision site
 Official Depi Evratesil Facebook page

2017
Countries in the Eurovision Song Contest 2017
Eurovision